The Battle of Burkersdorf was fought on June 28, 1866, during the Austro-Prussian War. It featured the Austrian X Corps against the Prussian Guard Corps and ended in a Prussian victory.

Burkersdorf (Střítež) 
After having beaten back Bonin's I Corps at Trautenau in the only Austrian victory against the Prussians, Glabenz's position became untenable due to the Austrian loss at Nachod and the Prussian Guard Corps' advance towards Eipel (Upice), and he was ordered to retreat towards Prausnitz (Brusnice) to block the Prussian Guards. At 9:00 AM Prussian hussars scouted X Corps decamping from the heights near Trautenau, and the Prussian Guard commander ordered an advance towards Deutsch-Prausnitz, south of Trautenau. Meanwhile, having received his marching orders at 7:00 AM, Glabenz lost time in ordering the retreat and he decided to send his Grivicic brigade to Radec to hit the Prussian Guard in the flank. At 8:00 near Burkersdorf Glabenz marching columns encountered the 2nd Prussian Guard brigade. Glabenz deployed his Knebel and Mondel brigades in a defensive semi-circle. The Austrian 64 gun main battery was able to hold the Prussians for an hour but at 9:30 AM they broke through to Burkersdorf (Střítež). Having been able to shift the majority of his Corps westwards to Pilnikau (Pilnikov), Glabenz left a regiment from Knebel's brigade behind as rear guard to hold up the Prussians at Burkersdorf. By 10:00 AM the town was taken by the Prussians Guards only after heavy fighting which cost them 500 men. The Austrian rear guard then joined Glabenz's retreat.

Rudersdorf (Rubínovice) 
Having been ordered by Glabenz to march towards Radec and not knowing the outcome of the fighting at Burkersdorf (Střítež), Colonel Grivicic at 12:00 AM reached the town of Rudersdorf ( Rubínovice), where he stood poised between the 1st and 2nd Prussian Guard Divisions. At Rudersdorf Grivicic encountered a Prussian battalion which had been detached as flank protection. Assuming he was faced by an entire division, Grivicic took up a defensive position against the Prussian battalion. By 1:00 PM, having understood his mistake, Grivicic restarted a cautious advance against the Prussian line, which had been reinforced by a second battalion and later by the 4th Guards Brigade. Failing to make headway against the Dreyse needle gun, Grivicic halted the advance and then retreated towards the town, which was then fought over house-to-house. As three new Prussian Guard battalions appeared and turned his right flank, making the brigade collapse and disperse. In all, Grivicic brigade lost 2512 men and was effectively destroyed.

References

Literature
 Geoffrey Wawro: The Austro-Prussian War: Austria’s War with Prussia and Italy in 1866, Cambridge University Press, Cambridge, UK, 1997

Burkersdorf
Burkersdorf
Burkersdorf
Burkersdorf
1866 in the Austrian Empire
19th century in Bohemia
June 1866 events
1866 in Germany
Frederick III, German Emperor
History of the Hradec Králové Region